Susurluk railway station is a railway station in Susurluk, Turkey. Located just north of the town, TCDD Taşımacılık operates two daily trains from İzmir to Bandırma: The southbound 6th of September Express and the northbound 17th of September Express. The station was built in 1913, by the Smyrna Cassaba Railway.

References

External links
Station information
Station timetable
TCDD Taşımacılık

Railway stations in Balıkesir Province
Railway stations opened in 1913
1913 establishments in the Ottoman Empire
Susurluk District